Annadale is a middle-class neighborhood on the South Shore of the borough of Staten Island in New York City.

History
The community received its present name circa 1860, and is named after Anna Seguine, a descendant of French Huguenots who were among the South Shore's earliest settlers; this settlement is also responsible for the neighborhood immediately to the southwest of Annadale being named Huguenot, and the Seguine family also lends its name to Seguine Avenue, the principal north-south thoroughfare on the east side of Prince's Bay, the next neighborhood southwest of Huguenot.

In 1929, immigrants from Spain purchased land along the Annadale shoreline, and founded a settlement that became known as the Spanish Camp, or Spanish Colony.  First tents, and later bungalows, were built at the site.  The site was purchased and buildings demolished at the end of the 20th century so that several large, upscale homes could be constructed.

Geography
Annadale once had abundant woodland, but much of it was cleared in the last three decades of the 20th Century to make room for new homes.  However, a city park in the heart of the neighborhood was converted into a wildlife preserve; known as Blue Heron Park Preserve, it covers 222 acres (898,000 m2), much of it consisting of ponds, swamps and small streams which empty into nearby Raritan Bay.

The northwestern part of Annadale is now often regarded as a separate neighborhood known as Arden Heights. Southeast Annadale also harbors its own identity separate from the rest of the neighborhood. This section of Annadale is most often associated with Blue Heron Park.

Public libraries
New York Public Library operates the Huguenot Park Branch, which serves Annadale and other neighborhoods, at 830 Huguenot Avenue at Drumgoole Road East. The branch opened in January 1985.

Transportation
Annadale is served by the Staten Island Railway's Annadale Station, at Amboy Road/Annadale Road.

It is served by the  local buses and the  express buses.

Korean War Veterans Parkway passes through Annandale.

References

Neighborhoods in Staten Island
Populated coastal places in New York (state)